Benjamin Robert Merrick  is a British civil servant who was Director of Overseas Territories at the Foreign, Commonwealth and Development Office from August 2017 until July 2021.

He held the position of  Commissioner of the British Antarctic Territory and Commissioner of the British Indian Ocean Territory, prior to that he was the deputy director of the Overseas Territories and was among the cabinet office of Ministry of Defence as Head of Arms Control and Counter Proliferation Policy from 2012 to 2015.

He also served as member of the British Antarctic Territory directorate in Foreign and Commonwealth Office. Since 2019 he has been deputy Disability Champion for the Civil Service. He was appointed Companion of the Order of St Michael and St George (CMG) in the 2022 New Year Honours for services to British foreign policy.

Merrick is legally blind.

Notes 

1988 births
Living people
Members of HM Diplomatic Service
Commissioners of the British Antarctic Territory
Commissioners of the British Indian Ocean Territory
English blind people
Companions of the Order of St Michael and St George
21st-century British diplomats